National Secondary Route 100, or just Route 100 (or ) is a National Road Route of Costa Rica, located in the San José province.

Description
In San José province the route covers San José canton (Uruca district), Goicoechea canton (Calle Blancos district), Tibás canton (Cinco Esquinas district).

References

Highways in Costa Rica